National Route 199 is a national highway of Japan connecting Moji-ku, Kitakyūshū and Yahata Nishi-ku, Kitakyūshū in Japan, with a total length of 33.2 km (20.63 mi).

References

National highways in Japan
Roads in Fukuoka Prefecture